β-Santalol is an organic compound that is classified as a sesquiterpene. It comprises about 20% of the oil of sandalwood, the major component being α-santalol. In 2002, about 60 tons of sandalwood oil were produced by steam distillation of the heartwood of Santalum album.

Because of concerns about the sustainability of sandalwood tree cultivation, scientists have developed routes to α-santalol and β-santalol via fermentation, including using Rhodobacter sphaeroides. BASF launched its version, Isiobionic Santalol, in July 2020.

References

Perfume ingredients
Primary alcohols
Sesquiterpenes
Bicyclic compounds